Reid Paley (born in Brooklyn, New York) is an American singer, songwriter, and musician who has been performing and recording both solo and with his trio since the mid-1990s.

Early career
In the 1980s, Paley was singer, front man, and writer for post-punk blues-band-from-hell The Five, which he founded in Pittsburgh, Pennsylvania. In the first year of the band's existence The Five released limited pressings of a vinyl single "Napalm Beach b/w Excite Me" and an EP Act of Contrition. The band later moved to Boston and spent several years headlining clubs and playing to enthusiastic crowds before breaking up in the late 1980s. A vinyl LP entitled The Five was released posthumously.

Solo work / Reid Paley Trio
Returning to Brooklyn in the early 1990s, Paley continued writing and began performing solo in rock clubs on the Lower East Side, singing his songs and playing a 1955 Gretsch archtop guitar plugged into a 1965 Fender Super Reverb amplifier.

After a series of self-released tapes available only at shows, Sub Pop released his solo debut, the vinyl single "Time For You" b/w "The Best Of All".  Paley's first solo album Lucky's Tune was produced by Frank Black (formerly and again Black Francis), and released by GoodNoise in 1999.  This was followed in 2000 by the album Revival, featuring Paley accompanied by Robert Lee Oliver on the three-string bass and James Murray on the trap kit, and produced by Eric Drew Feldman, who along with Jim Duffy also guests on the album. The album was released by eMusic, and is the first recorded appearance of the Reid Paley Trio.

Throughout the late 1990s and early 2000s, Paley played across the US and Western Europe, including numerous tours as support for Frank Black. Paley and Black have also collaborated on the writing of a number of songs, some of which appear on the Frank Black albums Honeycomb ("Another Velvet Nightmare"), Fast Man Raider Man ("I'm Not Dead (I'm in Pittsburgh)", "Golden Shore", "Dog Sleep", "Down To You"), and Christmass ("Don't Get Me Wrong"). A Frank Black & the Catholics recording of Paley's "Take What You Want" appears on their limited edition single "Everything Is New."

Paley toured the UK in 2004 and 2006, and plays the occasional festival, including the Vienna Festwochen/Into The City in Vienna, Austria (with Eric Drew Feldman sitting in on keys), and the Blues Rules Festival in Crissier, Switzerland in May 2010 (with Jerome O'Brien sitting in on upright bass).

In 2007 the album Approximate Hellhound vs The Monkey Demon was released by Metaphor Rhythms. It was produced by Paley and, like all his previous releases, was recorded on analog tape. On this album he was accompanied by Eric Eble on Czechoslovakian upright bass and James Murray on the trap kit. As of 2012, this remains the current lineup of the Reid Paley Trio.

Reid Paley lives in Brooklyn, New York.

Paley & Francis
In the fall of 2010 in Nashville, Reid Paley and Black Francis/Frank Black recorded an album of new songwriting collaborations, appearing under the moniker Paley & Francis.

The Paley & Francis album (also titled Paley & Francis) was produced by Jon Tiven, and features Reid Paley and Black Francis on guitars and vocals, accompanied by Spooner Oldham on piano and David Hood on bass. The album was released in October 2011 on Sonic Unyon in North America, and on Cooking Vinyl in the UK and Europe.

Paley & Francis debuted live in early September 2011 with club performances in Albany NY, Buffalo NY, and Hamilton Ontario (unannounced), and as one of the headliners of Hamilton Ontario's Supercrawl Festival. The band for these performances consisted of Reid Paley & Black Francis on guitars and vocals, Eric Eble (of the Reid Paley Trio) on bass, and Dave Varriale on drums.

The Paley & Francis album is slated for release as a vinyl LP in 2022 by Demon Music Group.

Discography
Reid Paley
 Time For You / The Best Of All, Sub Pop vinyl single, 1997 (Produced by James Murray)
 Lucky's Tune, LP, 1999 (Produced by Frank Black a.k.a.Black Francis, released by GoodNoise)
 Revival, LP, 2000 (Produced by Eric Drew Feldman, released by eMusic)
 Revival, LP, 2001 (Produced by Eric Drew Feldman, released by German label XXS with 4 songs from Lucky's Tune as bonus tracks)
 Approximate Hellhound, LP, 2007 (Produced by Reid Paley, released by Metaphor Rhythms)

Paley & Francis
 Paley & Francis, LP, 2011 – Collaboration with Black Francis (Produced by Jon Tiven, released by Sonic Unyon in the North America, and Cooking Vinyl in the UK & Europe)

References

External links
reidpaley.com
Paley & Francis Facebook Page

American rock musicians
American rock songwriters
American rock singers
Musicians from Brooklyn
Living people
Year of birth missing (living people)
Singers from New York City
Sonic Unyon artists
American male singer-songwriters
Singer-songwriters from New York (state)